The 1969 Cork Intermediate Football Championship was the 34th staging of the Cork Intermediate Football Championship since its establishment by the Cork County Board in 1909. The draw for the opening round fixtures took place on 26 January 1969. The championship began on 20 April 1969 and ended on 13 November 1969.

The final was played on 13 November 1969 at Cloughduv GAA Grounds, between St Michael's and Dohenys, in what was their first ever final meeting. St. Michael's won the match by 5-08 to 1-03 to claim their first ever championship title.

Results

Quarter-finals

Semi-finals

Final

References

Cork Intermediate Football Championship